Club Baloncesto Ciudad de Algeciras, officially named as Agrupación Deportiva Carteia, is a basketball club in the city of Algeciras in southern Spain.

History
The club was formed in 1998 and managed to work its way up the league from modest beginnings. Financial issues hit the club in 2004, forcing it to sell the berth in LEB Oro to Bruesa GBC in the next summer, but the club still creates a range of competitive teams.

Nowadays, the club continues playing in the youth competition of Andalusia.

Season to season

Notable players
 Ricardo Guillén
 Aaron Swinson

References

External links
Official blog 
Profile at FEB.es 

Sport in Algeciras
Basketball teams in Andalusia
Former LEB Oro teams
Former LEB Plata teams
Former Liga EBA teams